Victoria Azarenka was the two-time defending champion, but withdrew before the tournament began because of a foot injury.

Simona Halep won the title, defeating Angelique Kerber in the final, 6–2, 6–3.

Seeds
The top eight seeds receive a bye into the second round.

 Li Na (third round)
 Agnieszka Radwańska (semifinals)
 Petra Kvitová (quarterfinals)
 Sara Errani (quarterfinals)
 Jelena Janković (semifinals)
 Angelique Kerber (final)
 Simona Halep (champion)
 Caroline Wozniacki (second round)
 Ana Ivanovic (second round)
 Dominika Cibulková (first round, retired because of a gastrointestinal illness)
 Roberta Vinci (first round)
 Samantha Stosur (second round)
 Carla Suárez Navarro (withdrew because of an elbow injury)
 Sloane Stephens (first round)
 Eugenie Bouchard (first round)
 Kirsten Flipkens (first round)

Draw

Finals

Top half

Section 1

Section 2

Bottom half

Section 3

Section 4

Qualifying

Seeds

Qualifiers

Lucky losers
  Tadeja Majerič

Draw

First qualifier

Second qualifier

Third qualifier

Fourth qualifier

Fifth qualifier

Sixth qualifier

Seventh qualifier

Eighth qualifier

References
 Main Draw
 Qualifying Draw

Qatar Total Open - Singles
2014 Singles